Government College of Technology may refer to:

India
 Government College of Technology, Coimbatore

Pakistan
 Government College of Technology, Bahawalpur
 Government College of Technology, Faisalabad
 Government College of Technology, Multan
 Government College of Technology, Rasul, now University of Engineering and Technology, Rasul

See also
 Institute of technology